Steve Freeman is a retired American soccer midfielder who played, coached and founded a team in the USISL.

Freeman grew up in Tampa Florida where he played for Tampa Blackwatch Keelley as a youth player.  He graduated from Bloomingdale High School.  In 1992, Freeman began his collegiate career at Hartwick College.  He then transferred to Siena College for one season before finishing his last two seasons at the College of Saint Rose in Florida.  He graduated with a bachelor's degree in education.  In 1995, Freeman joined the Albany Alleycats of the USISL Pro League.  In 1998, Freeman signed with the Electric City Shockers of the Northeast Indoor Soccer League

In January 1997, Freeman founded the Albany Blackwatch as a youth club.  In 2003, Blackwatch formed a USL Premier Development League team under the name of Blackwatch Highlanders.  Freeman was the general manager and player that first season.  In 2007, he coached the Highlanders.  In 2008 and 2009, Blackwatch went on hiatus.  When the team returned in 2010, Freeman was the team president.

Freeman also served to terms on the US Club Soccer National Board of Directors (2002–06, 2009–11).

In 2014, Freeman became the Head Soccer Coach at Christian Brothers Academy (Albany, New York).

References

Living people
1974 births
American soccer coaches
American soccer chairmen and investors
American soccer players
Albany Alleycats players
Albany BWP Highlanders players
Hartwick Hawks men's soccer players
Siena Saints men's soccer players
USL League Two coaches
USL League Two players
USL Second Division players
Association football midfielders
Soccer players from Florida